Shepherd Bushiri also known as Major 1 is a Malawian, Christian preacher, self proclaimed prophet, businessman, motivational speaker, and author.

He is a controversial figure who gained popularity after releasing a video that showed him walking in the air   and he runs a Christian non-denominational charismatic evangelical church known as the Enlightened Christian Gathering based in South Africa. The church has headquarters in Pretoria, South Africa, with branches in other African countries and around the world. Tens of thousands of people are attracted to the church every day. He describes the church as a Prophetic Ministry based on the principle that "God cares and loves people and wants to speak directly to them".

Bushiri's investment company, Shepherd Bushiri Investments, has been implicated in several charges of fraud, and money laundering and several of its assets have been seized by police after a ponzi scheme it ran collapsed and pensioners were defrauded. The company was also sued in the United States of America and charges of fraud laid.  The company is based in Sandton, near Johannesburg, 27+ mines, with interests in forex trading, real estate and in the airline industry. He also owns a television channel, a telecommunications company, various farms, properties, sports academies and universities. Bushiri ventured into business as a young man to support his community and the work of the gospel globally. His rise to wealth has been called meteoric, using innovative business methods in various industries to accumulate riches.

Early life
Bushiri was born and grew up in Mzuzu, which is in the northern part of Malawi and is a Tumbuka by tribe. His mother gave him the name Shepherd due to the complexities around his birth, acknowledging the Lord as her Shepherd.

He travels around the world holding crusades and meetings focused on teaching, prophesy and healing. In August 2018, he was invited as a guest of honour at South Africa's National Day of Inter-faith prayer held at the Emirates Airline Stadium in Johannesburg, during which he offered prayers of reconciliation and unity. The event was attended by South African leading clergy and South Africa's Vice President David Mabuza.

Given name controversy
Claims were made in The Citizen in February 2019 that Bushiri was born as Chipiliro Gama; "an invoice mistakenly sent to Baloyi Attorneys did not use the popular name Shepherd Bushiri, and instead called him Chipiliro Gama". A report in The Sunday Times newspaper for February 2019 stated that "Bushiri's father, Huxley, and mother, Cristina, a Zambian by birth raised him as Chipiliro Gama".

In September 2019, Bushiri's spokesperson and communications director, Ephraim Nyondo, denied the allegations.

Career
Bushiri is now known as one of the wealthiest pastors in the world and one of the most affluent people in Africa.

He is mentored by multimillionaire businessman and leader of Good News Church in the UK, Prophet Uebert Angel. Bushiri is said to be the most celebrated and popular "spiritual son" of Prophet Angel.

Enlightened Christian Gathering church
The Enlightened Christian Gathering church is reported as one of the fastest-growing churches in Africa and the world. Bushiri is the founder of the church. He has established and leads churches in South Africa, Malawi, Ghana, South Sudan and other countries. He has been interviewed for television by the BBC and received coverage also in Al Jazeera, New African, Nigerian Tribune, and African Leadership magazine.

On the night of 28 December 2018, three people died, and nine others were injured during a stampede at the ECG Church caused by people trying to avoid a thunderstorm. Bushiri's spokesman Maynard Manyowa told the media, "The ECG Church is not his [Bushiri's] church; it belongs to South Africa and South Africans." Manyowa also said that the deaths were "not his [Bushiri's] problem, but a problem that the church must deal with."

Bushiri's services attract over  viewers via his personally-owned television station, social media and in-person attendees. His largest gatherings are held on New Year's Eve at FNB Stadium, South Africa, with over  attendees both in 2016 and 2017.  The FNB Stadium is the largest stadium in Africa.

His church gatherings have always been well received.

Shepherd Bushiri Investments
Bushiri's company, Shepherd Bushiri Investments, is a controversial company that has been implicated in fraud, money laundering, tax evasion and ponzi schemes. South African Police seized properties and bank accounts belonging to the company after discovering it had defrauded pensioners of $6 million USD. The company claims to be an international investment company, based in Sandton near Johannesburg, with interests in oil, mining, real estate, transportation, and the hospitality industry. On 20 February 2018, Bushiri launched one of his hotel investments, a multimillion-dollar property in South Africa. The hotel is one of the properties seized by South African Police after Bushiri skipped bail and fled to his home country.. SBI has a special interest in supporting governments, including economies of fragile state countries. In 2017, Bushiri was hosted by the Vice President of South Sudan – Dr. James Igga, Reserve Bank Governor and Finance Minister, during which a business deal was signed in the area of infrastructure and development. In 2018 Shepherd Bushiri was given the prestigious award and induction into the CEO Hall of Fame by the African Leadership magazine.

Charity work
Bushiri has been involved in many charitable works around the world, including work in Malawi, Nicaragua, Nigeria, Botswana, and South Africa. He formed a humanitarian organization called "Shepherd Bushiri Foundation" with Duncan Zgambo as the CEO, where he provides for the needy and less privileged. He provides charitable donations, including livelihood support; educational support for orphans; humanitarian relief through food subsidies. In 2017, he took maize to Lilongwe and spent K85 Million in Malawi Charity. He has invested in young people through his sports academy and through Major 1 Records, which sponsors and show-cases up-and-coming music artists. On 18 July 2018, Nelson Mandela Day, Bushiri launched an Africa-wide school adoption program with donations to a local school. The event was attended by Senior Government Officials from the South Africa Ministry of Education.

In March 2019, Bushiri visited Alexandra in South Africa, where a fire had burnt over 100 shacks. He said that he would donate R (equivalent to approx $) to emergency services "that should be used for the children in the area".

Other
On 11 February 2020, it was reported by the Nyasa Times and Malawi24 that Bushiri announced that he would be selling maize in Malawi at a price of MK5 000 (US$6.85) per 50  kg (110 lbs), or US$124.55 per ton. The international price for corn futures (yellow maize) at the time of the announcement was US$150 per ton or US$7.50 per 50  kg. The local prices for maize sold commercially in Malawi were three to four times higher than that quoted by Bushiri, selling for as much as MK20 000 per 50  kg According to various reports, thousands of people bought the cheap maize at various sites within Malawi.

Controversies

Curing HIV/AIDS
Bushiri has made claims of "curing HIV". He countered that he has never performed a miracle in his life because only Jesus can. Nevertheless, due to claims of unproven miracles, Botswana temporarily banned him from entering the country before courts ruled the ECG church is allowed to continue operating in the country. Initially he was free to enter the country at will, but now is required to apply for a visa every time he wants to enter Botswana.

Fees for public dinners
The alleged fees charged to attend some of Bushiri's prestigious public dinners have been applauded. It was speculated that he charged R for a seat at his table at a gala dinner held on 23 December 2017 at the Pretoria Showground, and N$ for entry to a dinner held in Windhoek, Namibia in January 2016. Bushiri in several news interviews refuted the published extreme pricing claims for "so-called gala dinners", calling them "fabricated".

Investment schemes
Allegedly, during a church service in March 2017, Bushiri announced that he wanted to make members of his church into millionaires. Congregants were then told via e-mail to invest at least R100 000 in cash with him within the next two days and were promised a 50% return within 30 banking days. Those that could not bring cash with them to the church were sent banking details of a company, Rising Estates, the directors of which are Bushiri lieutenants, Willah Mudolo, Duncan Oduor Otieno and Kit Ching Catherine Kum. Almost two years later, the people who gave Bushiri money claimed to have not received anything back.

The investment scheme appears to be linked to Palambano Investments as six congregants from Bushiri's church claim they were told that the money they donated would be invested in Zambia in "gold minerals" as part of a Palamabo investment scheme. The congregants provided proof that the money had been paid into the ECG's First National Bank account. East London, Eastern Cape police spokesperson Captain Mluleki Mbi confirmed that a case had been opened against Palambano Investments and its directors in response to a complaint by Nombeko Dwesini, one of Bushiri's congregants.

Paternity
It is alleged that in 2010, Bushiri impregnated a teenage Malawian woman, whom he met in 2007 in their home town, Mzimba. It is further claimed that he bribed her with a cheque for  Malawian kwacha (about R) to have an abortion but that the cheque bounced. The woman subsequently gave birth in 2011 to a girl who "is the spitting image of Bushiri and it is widely known in the district that he is the biological father", according to the father of the woman. The woman is now married and the family alleges that they "kept quiet out of fear". The village that the woman and child live in broke the news before the family approached Bushiri. Bushiri claims that the cheque was stolen from him and that, on the day the woman claims he made her pregnant, Bushiri was at a police station dealing with an attempted hijacking. In 2018, the mother again tried to get maintenance via the courts but was unsuccessful. Family members of the girl claim that Bushiri admits to the allegations in private, despite his public denials and have demanded a paternity test. His lawyer, Terrence Baloyi, did not respond to emails, text messages and calls from City Press seeking comment.

Non-payment for clothing
Darlington Manyawu, a businessman based in Hong Kong, claims to have sold Bushiri clothing to the value of R but had not received payment for them. He claims that the clothing was given to Bushiri's spokesman, Maynard Manyowa on 28 June 2019 and Bushiri has subsequently been seen wearing the clothes at public church gatherings. Ephraim Nyondo, the spokesman for the Elightened Christian Gathering church, did not dispute the claim but stated that the matter did not concern Bushiri as it was between Manyawu and Manyowa.

Radio Veritas
The South African Catholic radio station, Radio Veritas, was reprimanded by the Broadcasting Complaints Commission of South Africa (BCCSA) for airing a one-sided programme laced with allegations against Bushiri on 1 December 2019. Bushiri had claimed that the broadcast was "malicious, damaging to his reputation, libelous, contained lies, was unfounded" and did not afford him the right of reply. The BCCSA noted that Veritas Radio had contravened the broadcasting act in not presenting the opposing view from Bushiri.

Alleged infidelity
On 20 February 2020, former deputy finance minister of Zimbabwe, Terence Mukupe, accused Bushiri of an adulterous affair with Mukupe's musician wife, Rachel, which resulted in the impregnation of Rachel. He claimed to have WhatsApp evidence of his wife and the preacher arranging to meet for "sex romps in Malawi, Pretoria and Rustenburg". He also claimed that Bushiri had taken R (approx $) from him to finance his church, Enlightened Christian Gathering.

Bushiri responded to the allegations, saying that he had not left South Africa in the past 13 months and therefore could not have met with Rachel Mukupe. He also claimed that he had not used WhatsApp or iMessage for the past 3 years and hence could not have sent her the messages Terence Mukupe claimed to have found. Bushiri also said that he had engaged his lawyers in Zimbabwe to "urgently seek legal recours".

Mukupe's response to Bushiri was that Bushiri had not used his own phone to contact Rachel and that Mukupe had paid for the tickets for Bushiri to travel. According to reports, "Mukupe's public spat with Bushiri has divided opinion among ZANU–PF members over his psychological fitness to head the ZanuPF youth league."

On 3 March, Rachel (known as Rachel J) responded to the allegations between Bushiri and Mukupe. In her statement, released via her family, it was stated that:
 She was not married to Terence Mukupe although the man did live in her home and she had had children with him.
 She looked after him and his 10 children.
 Rachel had terminated their relationship because she had discovered that Terence Mukupe had once again impregnated Tracy Winterboer, the second child sired with the same woman during Rachel's relationship with Mukupe.
 The claims of her impregnation by Bushiri are unbelievable since Mukupe's evidence shows that they met in 2018. "How is it possible for her to carry a pregnancy for two years?" they asked.

On 4 March, Rachel J's family demanded a paternity test be performed on the child to prove that he was not Bushiri's.

On 6 March, Rachel gave birth to a daughter she referred to as "Najah, Deborah, Makomborero". No paternity tests had been conducted at that point.

Rape and Sexual Assault 
On March 21, 2021, South African Police charged Shepherd Bushiri with 16 counts of rape relating to 8 different victims. At the time the police had already issued 3 warrants of arrests relating to three separate charges of rape against Bushiri The police claimed that Bushiri targeted women and girls at his church. According to police documents, the girls, including some as young as 15 and who were sisters were kept in hotel rooms and brutally raped for hours before being given between $500 and $700 and being asked to leave. Police later announced they were investigating Bushiri's associates whom they accused of intimidating victims, and reported that several victims had come forward between 2016 and 2018 and accused Bushiri of rape before recanting their testimonies after being intimidated or paid off. In December 2021, police arrested Brigadier Rosey Resondt’s husband, Clifford Cornelius Resondt, who was Bushiri’s head of security and charged them with corruption and defeating the ends of justice after Bushiri sent them R500,000 which was given to a rape victim who later recanted her allegations.

Fraudulent permit 
On 24 October 2020 South African Police revealed that Shepherd Bushiri's residency in the country may have been irregular after noticing that his South African issued identity card was issued in 1996 but Bushiri and his wife had first travelled to South Africa in 2010 on tourist visas. The police later announced that Bushiri had paid for a fraudulent residency permit and deemed him an illegal immigrant. After the announcement, 5 officials were suspended for having issued Bushiri fraudulent identity documents.

Arrest
On 1 February 2019, Bushiri was arrested together with his wife by South Africa's Directorate for Priority Investigations (HAWKS) for fraud and money laundering. The Hawks said the case against the couple was linked to alleged offences of fraud and money laundering, as well as the contravention of South Africa's Prevention of Organised Crime Act (POCA), which had been committed from 2015. The contravention of the Act was in relation to Exchange Control Regulations relating to foreign currency of $.

On 28 August 2019, Bushiri's court case was postponed until 29 November 2019 to allow his legal team, including Terrence Baloyi and Barry Roux, to make representations to the National Prosecuting Authority. The case was subsequently postponed to 27 July 2020 for trial, at which time it was postponed to October 2020.

In November 2019, application was made by the National Prosecuting Authority (NPA) for the forfeiture of a 1984 Gulfstream aircraft owned by Bushiri and hangared at Lanseria airport, north of Johannesburg. The NPA claimed that the aircraft had been procured with funds illegally obtained. Bushiri claimed that it was legitimately acquired in 2016 for $ (R). The application for forfeiture was not ready to go ahead and was removed from the court roll.

Bushiri and his wife were each granted R (approx $) bail after appearing in the Specialised Commercial Crimes Court in Pretoria on 6 February 2019. Among the bail conditions were that the couple remain in Gauteng and their travel documents remain with the state. If they needed to travel, they would need to get written permission from investigating officers. Bushiri and wife were also not allowed to make contact with any of the witnesses.

On 20 October 2020, prior to their court appearance on 30 October 2020, the Bushiris were arrested on charges which were not included in the previous cases. Conflicting reports implicated various combinations of Landiwe Sindani, Landiwe Ntokwana, Willah Mudolo and Zethu Mudolo in the fraud case as co-accused with the Bushiris. The Bushiris are also accused of being illegally in South Africa and of having contravened the immigration regulations on several occasions since at least 2015. Their bail application was set for 30 October. The Bushiris had not been released from prison as they were considered a flight risk as evidenced by the allegations that they had illegally exported a Bentley and a Maserati to Malawi earlier in 2020.

The trial date for the fraud case was set for May 2021.

On 14 November 2020, reports surfaced that Bushiri and his wife had fled back to Malawi, breaking bail conditions due to fears for their safety. On November 20, Bushiri and his wife, who were arrested in their native country on November 18, were released from a Malawi prison after their arrest was deemed unprocedural.

The following week, Bushiri and his wife were arrested again and arraigned before the court's where Malawi prosecutors sought to extradite them to South Africa. They were released on bail and their extradition case is ongoing. In February 2022 the high court refused to throw out Bushiri's challenge of his extradition and instead sent the case to the Magistrate's court for ruling.

Personal life
Bushiri was born to a Malawian father and a Zambian mother. He is married to Mary Bushiri, who is active in charity work. They have two daughters together. On 29 March 2021, Bushiri announced the passing away of his first daughter Israella in Kenya after a lengthy respiratory illness, and stated that as a father it was his desire to see her grow and serve the Lord.

References

External links
Official Biography of Prophet Shepherd Bushiri
"Major One", Shepherd Bushiri Ministries
Prophet Shepherd Bushiri website
Enlightened Christian Gathering website

Living people
Malawian clergy
1983 births
Malawian evangelicals
Sexual abuse scandals in Evangelicalism